Stantley Thomas-Oliver III (born June 4, 1998) is an American football cornerback for the Carolina Panthers of the National Football League (NFL). He played college football at Florida International.

College career
Thomas-Oliver began his career at Florida International as a wide receiver and had 36 receptions for 489 yards and a touchdown in two seasons. He became a cornerback prior to his junior year after jokingly covering teammates in practice, making 24 starts over his last two seasons. In his first year at the new position, Thomas-Oliver was a 2018 All-Conference USA Honorable Mention. As a senior, he earned second-team All-Conference USA honors after posting eight passes defensed, an interception, 2.0 sacks, and 4.0 tackles for loss. In his career he had 94 career, two interceptions, seven tackles for loss and 2.0 sacks.

Professional career
Thomas-Oliver was selected in the seventh round of the 2020 NFL Draft with the 221st overall pick by the Carolina Panthers.

On November 20, 2021, Thomas-Oliver was placed on injured reserve. He was activated on December 18.

On October 16, 2022, Thomas-Oliver was placed on injured reserve.

References

External links
Carolina Panthers bio
FIU Panthers bio

Living people
1998 births
American football wide receivers
American football cornerbacks
Carolina Panthers players
FIU Panthers football players
People from Punta Gorda, Florida
Players of American football from Florida